The women's 4 × 100 metres relay event at the 1994 Commonwealth Games was held on 28 August at the Centennial Stadium in Victoria, British Columbia.

Results

References

Relay
1994
1994 in women's athletics